Chris John Myers from the University of Utah, Salt Lake City was named Fellow of the Institute of Electrical and Electronics Engineers (IEEE) in 2013 for contributions to design and testing for asynchronous, analog, and genetic circuits.

References

Fellow Members of the IEEE
Living people
Year of birth missing (living people)
Place of birth missing (living people)
University of Utah faculty
American electrical engineers